Shaanxiscolex is an extinct genus of palaeoscolecid worm from the Cambrian Stage 4. The type species is Shaanxiscolex xixiangensis and was named in 2018 by Yang et al.

See also
2018 in paleontology

References

Paleoscolecids
Fossil taxa described in 2018